Drew Wilson (born 1 January 1967) was a junior and senior road race cycling champion in the 80s and 90s who turned professional in 1994 after trialing with Banana/Falcon Representing Scotland at the Commonwealth Games in 1986 1994 & 1998.

Biography

Wilson was encouraged to take up cycling by his mother and father at the age of 12. In his early teens he became the highest ranked junior road cyclist in Scotland.

He began to build a hard earned reputation as a junior, representing GB at two junior world championships. Wilson rode for Italy's second biggest Italian team GS Bottegonne headed by the Italian sprinter Mario Cipollini. In 1993 Wilson had a successful trial with the UK's No.1 professional team Banana - Falcon and turned professional for them in 1994.

Wilson retired from professional cycling not long after representing Scotland in his third Commonwealth Games in Kuala Lumpur in 1998.

Scotland Commonwealth Games Team 
  1986 Scotland
  1994 Vancouver
  1998 Kuala Lumpur

Cycling history 
  GS Bottegonne team rider (Italy's second biggest amateur cycling team)
  Tour of Britain rider 
  Scottish road champion six times
  Scottish junior road champion
  Scottish senior road champion
  Scottish Criterium champion twice
  Scottish senior BAR champion twice
  Professional road rider with Banana/Falcon and Foremost/Karrimor cycling team
  World championship rider twice for Great Britain
  Winner – Glasgow-Dunoon road race twice
  Winner – David Bell memorial road race in 1996 and 1998
  Winner – Drummond trophy road race three times

Honours, decorations, awards and distinctions
In 1994, Wilson was awarded an honorary life membership of the Johnstone Wheelers Cycling Club.

The business of cycling
Wilson had an early introduction to bike building, sales and maintenance whilst working part-time for his first sponsors, Dooley's Cycles. After retiring from professional cycling he learned even more about the technical aspects of bike design and aerodynamics whilst working for Massi, Raleigh and Ridley.

In 2014 Wilson launched VisualBikeFit, a bespoke bike fitting service in his studio at the foot of the Crow Road in Lennoxtown.

See also
British Cycling Points 1998
Johnstone Wheelers List of Scottish Champions
Scotland at the Commonwealth Games

References

1967 births
Living people
People educated at Linwood High School
Scottish male cyclists
Sportspeople from Paisley, Renfrewshire
Cyclists at the 1986 Commonwealth Games
Cyclists at the 1994 Commonwealth Games
Cyclists at the 1998 Commonwealth Games
Commonwealth Games competitors for Scotland